Paradise is a 1982 Canadian adventure romance film written and directed by Stuart Gillard (in his directorial debut). It stars Phoebe Cates, Willie Aames, and Tuvia Tavi. The original music score was composed by Paul Hoffert with the theme song written and produced by Joel Diamond and L. Russell Brown and sung by Phoebe Cates.

It was critiqued at the time as a "knockoff" of the more-famous The Blue Lagoon, as it shared a similar story to the 1980 film.

Plot summary
In 1823, during the Georgian era, teenagers David and Sarah travel with a caravan from Baghdad to Damascus. At an oasis, a slaver known as 'the Jackal' raids the party and attempts to add the beautiful young Sarah to his harem. David and Sarah and her servant, Geoffrey, narrowly escape, but all the others are slain in a massacre, including David's American missionary parents. When Geoffrey seeks help at an encampment controlled by the Jackal, he is killed.

David and Sarah rest at a nearby enclave as they head west toward civilization. Their flight leads them to a beautiful oasis — a Paradise—where they discover love and sex. However, the Jackal does not give up hope of capturing Sarah, so David must lure him to his death. At the conclusion, Sarah reveals to David that she is pregnant and the two young lovers finally reach civilization, the city of Damascus.

Cast
 Phoebe Cates – Sarah
 Willie Aames – David
 Tuvia Tavi – The Jackal
 Richard Curnock – Geoffrey
 Neil Vipond – Reverend
 Aviva Marks – Rachel 
 Yosef Shiloach – Ahmed

Production
Producers of the film, Robert Lantos and Stephen J. Roth first selected Aames and later, after a screen test, agreed on Cates for the role of Sarah. The film marked the acting debut of Cates, who was 17 years old at the time of filming. Cates's starring role involved several fully nude scenes. She was also selected to sing the movie's theme song. The film was shot on location at various settings in Israel including Tel Aviv, the Dead Sea and the Sea of Galilee.

During production, Aames and Cates both decided that the film did not need as much nudity as the script called for. In interviews, Aames and Cates claimed that "the producer (Lantos) went back to Canada and used somebody else in the shots. They weren't in the version of the film they showed us for approval. When I finally got to see the final print months later, I flipped." Lantos responded to this by saying that it was up to himself and the distributor to decide what would be included in the final release, not any of the actors. He furthermore claimed that "99% of it was what Willie and Phoebe shot."

Nevertheless, Aames agreed to promote the film because, as he admitted, "aside from those parts that bother me, it's a damn good film." Cates felt differently and refused to have anything to do with promotion, such as screenings and parties. According to Aames, Cates was "really upset" by the film.

Critical reception
On Metacritic the film has a weighted average score of 20 out of 100, based on 5 critics, indicating "generally unfavorable reviews".

Writing in The Washington Post, Tom Shales stated that Paradise "amounts to 100 minutes of agonizing tedium seasoned with equal parts excruciating embarrassment." He also criticized the depiction of the Jackal, describing the character as "an offensively stereotyped Arab". Leonard Maltin's annual Movie Guide book describes it this way: "Rating: star and a half. Silly Blue Lagoon ripoff, with Aames and Cates discovering sex while stranded in the desert. Both, however, do look good sans clothes."  Upon its release, when reviewed on the show Sneak Previews, Roger Ebert selected it as his "Dog of the Week," the worst film he saw that week, and heavily berated it. In his book Reel Bad Arabs, writer Jack Shaheen  criticized Paradise for the character of the Jackal, calling him a "particularly degrading" depiction of an Arab sheikh.

Nominations
Golden Raspberry Awards
Nominated: Worst Actor (Willie Aames)

References

External links
 
 
 
 

1980s adventure drama films
1980s Canadian films
1980s coming-of-age drama films
1980s English-language films
1980s historical drama films
1980s historical romance films
1980s teen drama films
1980s teen romance films
1982 directorial debut films
1982 films
1982 independent films
1982 romantic drama films
Canadian adventure drama films
Canadian coming-of-age drama films
Canadian historical drama films
Canadian independent films
Canadian romantic drama films
Canadian teen drama films
Coming-of-age romance films
Embassy Pictures films
English-language Canadian films
Films directed by Stuart Gillard
Films set in 1823
Films set in the Middle East
Films shot in Israel
New World Pictures films
Teen adventure films